Sarvanlar may refer to:
Sis, Armenia
Sarvanlar, Aghjabadi, Azerbaijan
Sarvanlar, Tartar, Azerbaijan